A special election was held in  on September 5, 1796 and November 21, 1796 to fill a vacancy caused by the resignation of Theodore Sedgwick (F) upon his election to the Senate

Election results
Two elections were held due to a majority not being achieved on the first ballot.

Skinner took office on January 27, 1797

See also
List of special elections to the United States House of Representatives

References

Massachusetts 1796 01
Massachusetts 1796 01
1796 01
Massachusetts 01
United States House of Representatives 01
United States House of Representatives 1796 01